Thomas Baines Nature Reserve is a  nature reserve in the Eastern Cape, South Africa that is managed by Eastern Cape Parks. It was created as a municipal reserve in 1961 and upgraded to a provincial reserve in 1980. It is named after the artist and explorer Thomas Baines who recorded the region's flora and fauna. 

The northern shore of the Settlers Dam forms the southern boundary of the reserve.

Fauna 
Mammals found within the reserve are:

 African buffalo
 Chacma baboon
 Common eland
 Greater kudu
 Monkey
 Oribi 
 Red hartebeest
 Warthog
 Zebra

Besides these mammals, 175 bird species have been recorded in the park.

Flora 
Along with fynbos vegetation, the reserve contains Albany thicket woodland.

Activities 
There are various featured activities found within the park such as game drives, canoeing, camping, bird watching, sailing, bass fishing, environmental education and hiking.

See also

References

External links
 Thomas Baines Nature Reserve Eastern Cape Parks

Eastern Cape Provincial Parks
Protected areas of the Eastern Cape